The 1966 season was the Hawthorn Football Club's 42nd season in the Victorian Football League and 65th overall. Following the season John Kennedy Sr. returned as coach.

Fixture

Premiership season

Ladder

References

Hawthorn Football Club seasons